This is a list of Nigerian women academics. An academic is a person who works as a teacher or researcher at a university or other higher education institution.

Nigerian women academics

 Olubola Babalola
 Funke Abimbola 
 Beatrice Aboyade
 Patricia Lar
 Ayoka Olufunmilayo Adebambo
 Catherine Obianuju Acholonu 
 Maggie Aderin-Pocock 
 Olanike Adeyemo
 Chimamanda Ngozi Adichie
 Tomilayo Adekanye
 Deborah Ajakaiye 
 Jadesola Akande 
 Dora Akunyili 
 Sarah Alade 
 Tejumade Alakija 
 Grace Alele-Williams 
 Zaynab Alkali 
 Sefi Atta 
 Bolanle Awe 
 Ayo Ayoola-Amale 
 Ibiyemi Olatunji-Bello
 Adejoke Ayoola 
 Uche Azikiwe 
 Babalola Chinedum Peace 
 Grace Ebun Delano 
 Comfort Ekpo 
 Buchi Emecheta 
 Adeyinka Gladys Falusi 
 Adenike Grange 
 Francisca Oboh Ikuenobe 
 Jackie Kay 
 Sarah Ladipo Manyika 
 Amina J. Mohammed 
 Eucharia Oluchi Nwaichi 
 Flora Nwapa 
 Chinwe Obaji 
 Aize Obayan  
 Jumoke Oduwole 
 Molara Ogundipe
 Adetowun Ogunsheye
 Kathleen Adebola Okikiolu 
 Nnenna Okore 
 Chinyere Stella Okunna
 Smaranda Olarinde 
 Olufunmilayo Olopade 
 Felicity Okpete Ovai
 Adenike Osofisan 
 Oyèrónkẹ́ Oyěwùmí 
 Omowunmi Sadik 
 Arinola Olasumbo Sanya 
 Zulu Sofola 
 Margaret Adebisi Sowunmi
 Oluranti Adebule
 Olaitan Soyannwo 
 Grace Oladunni Taylor
 Olutoyin Mejiuni

References

Academics
Nigerian women academics
Academics